Aliens Group is a privately held Indian real estate and construction company founded in 2004 and headquartered in Hyderabad, Telangana. It also has a group of companies such as Aliens Infra Tech Pvt Ltd and Aliens Developers.

The company has received the Asia Pacific Property Awards under two categories for its project- Apartment for Aliens Space Station and Mixed-Use Development for Aliens Space Station at the International Property Awards 2012.

History 
Aliens Group was founded in 2004 by Hari Challa and Venkat Challa. The company's notable projects include Aliens Valley, Aliens Elite and Aliens Hub.

Funding
Aliens Group raised INR Rs 200 crore (US$30 million) from Edelweiss Broking Limited for its project Aliens Space Station. The company handed over a Rs 580 crore contract to Mumbai based New Consolidated Construction (NCCCL) to speed up the construction work and ensure timely delivery of flats.

Completed Projects 

 Aliens Elite
 Aliens Valley
 Aliens Sweet home Venus
 Aliens Fasttrack
 Aliens Blend

On-Going Projects 

 Aliens Space Station
 Aliens Hub

Awards and Achievements
2008: Awarded a Platinum Rating by Indian Green Building Council (IGBC) in the Residential Townships Category.
 2008: Received IGBC Green Homes Platinum award under Indian Green Building Council.
 2009: Cityscape Awards Real Estate Asia under the best Residential Development- Future.
 2012: Asia Pacific Property Awards under two categories - Apartment for Aliens Space Station and Mixed-Use Development for Aliens Space Station, at the International Property Awards 2012.
 2012: The founder and MD of Aliens Group, Hari Challa has conferred The Green award for his project Space Station.
 2012: Aliens Group's founder Hari Challa also received The Platinum Award of Excellence and was listed 5 among India's Top Young Builders.

Controversy
The group ran into controversy due to delay in delivery of flats in - Aliens Space Station 1. This project was conceived in 2006 and pre-booking started in 2007. The project's construction got stalled later due to various politico-economic and alleged misuse of investors money reasons. Aggrieved home buyers started filing cases in Hyderabad Consumer court and in National Consumer Court. There was a group FIR filed by home buyers against the company in January 2015.

In March 2015, Harish Challa, Aliens Director, was jailed for about sixty (60) days later released on bail, for the breach of trust of House buyers under IPC sections 420 (cheating) and 406 (breach of trust), with at least 15+ FIRs registered, leading to even escalation of the matter to State Home Minister Nayani Narshimha Reddy by some home buyers.

In 2016, Aliens Group managed to raise Rs. 200 crore funding from ECL Finance Ltd, the non-banking financing arm of Edelweiss Financial Services Ltd which helped to resume construction in Space Station and closing out pending cases through compensating aggrieved customers.

See also 

 Logix Group

References

External links
 

Companies based in Hyderabad, India
2004 establishments in Andhra Pradesh
Real estate companies established in 2004
Real estate companies of India
Indian companies established in 2004